BIN or Bin may refer to:

Abbreviations
 Badan Intelijen Negara, Indonesia's state intelligence agency
 Bank Identification Number
 Belgian Institute for Normalization
 Believe in Nothing
 Black Information Network, a radio network
 British India (FIFA country code: BIN), the portions of present-day India, Bangladesh, Pakistan, and Myanmar that were under British colonial rule
 Business identification number

Physical containers
 Waste container
 Recycling bin
 Bulk box, a pallet-size box used for storage and shipping of bulk quantities
 Coal bin

People
 Bin Uehara, a Japanese singer
, Japanese footballer and manager
 Bianca Bin, a Brazilian actress
 BIN (Band), Japanese musical group

Places
 Bin (city), a settlement in Xia- and Shang-dynasty China
 Bin, Iran, a village in Mazandaran Province, Iran
 Bin County, Shaanxi in Xianyang, Shaanxi, China
 Bin County, Heilongjiang in Harbin, Heilongjiang, China

Science and mathematics
 an interval (mathematics), a mesh, or another partition of a topological space, used in different applications fields:
 Histogram bin
 Data binning, a data pre-processing technique
 Bin (computational geometry), space partitioning data structure to enable fast region queries and nearest neighbor search

Other uses
 Sin bin, an informal name for a penalty box in sports 
 In Arabic personal names, "son of", e.g. in "Hamad bin Khalid bin Hamad" (a variant of ibn)
 Bini language (ISO code: bin), a language of Edo State, Nigeria
 /bin, a folder in the Unix filesystem

See also 
 Bīn
 Binn (disambiguation)
 
 
 
 
 Money bin, a fictional structure of Scrooge McDuck
 Binary (disambiguation)